Ernest Nungaray Arce (born May 7, 1992) is an American soccer player who plays as an attacking midfielder for Carlos A. Mannucci.

Career
Born in Anaheim, California to Mexican parents, Nungaray began playing football with an amateur side in Tijuana which his father coached. In 2007, he joined the youth system of Monarcas Morelia. He made 13 appearances for Morelia's Ascenso MX affiliate Toros Neza before joining the parent club in Liga MX during 2013.

After failing to feature for Morelia in Liga MX, Nungaray signed with Correcaminos UAT, where he would make a single substitute's appearance in the Ascenso MX. He would later join Tiburones Rojos de Veracruz, but never played for the club in Liga MX before he moved to Liga Premier de Ascenso side Reynosa in 2015. In 2016, Nungaray was playing for Monarcas Morelia Premier in the third level of Mexican football.

Nungaray has dual-citizenship with Mexico and the United States, and has played for the United States men's national under-20 soccer team.

Personal
Nungaray is related to Mexican professional footballer Fernando Arce.

References

External links

1992 births
Living people
American soccer players
American sportspeople of Mexican descent
Atlético Morelia players
Correcaminos UAT footballers
Atlético Reynosa footballers
Toros Neza footballers
C.D. Veracruz footballers
Albinegros de Orizaba footballers
Sport Boys footballers
Carlos A. Mannucci players
Ayacucho FC footballers
Ascenso MX players
Peruvian Primera División players
Expatriate footballers in Mexico
Soccer players from California
Association football forwards